Reflections was a concert residency by Filipina singer Regine Velasquez at the Aliw Theater in Pasay. The residency began on November 4 and concluded on December 10, 2005, after completing eight shows. The set list featured songs curated by Velasquez from the discographies of her musical influences, such as Mariah Carey, Sharon Cuneta, Sheena Easton, Whitney Houston, and Kuh Ledesma. The show was jointly promoted by GMA Network and Aria Productions. Velasquez served as the stage and creative director for the concert, while Raul Mitra was the musical director. Kim Flores, Jona Viray, and Ai-Ai delas Alas were selected as guest acts.

Background and development
Regine Velasquez's music was rooted in American pop early in her career. The influence of artists such as Mariah Carey, Sheena Easton, and Whitney Houston was particularly apparent in her musical style. She admires Houston's R&B sound and Carey's songwriting, and cites various OPM artists, including Sharon Cuneta and Kuh Ledesma, as her role models. On October 25, 2005, The Philippine Star announced that Velasquez would perform eight shows in November and December at the Aliw Theater in Pasay called Reflections. The set list featured songs that were curated by Velasquez from the catalogue of her musical influences, which she described as songs "about my dreams, my aspirations and even my heartaches". It was jointly produced by GMA Network and Aria Productions. Velasquez served as the stage and creative director, while Raul Mitra was chosen as musical director. Kim Flores, Jona Viray, and Ai-Ai delas Alas were selected as guest acts.

Synopsis and recordings
The concert opened with an overture of Irene Cara's "Fame" as two female singers portraying younger versions of Velasquez each took turns singing verses from the song.  Velasquez appeared onstage and accompanied the singers as the number continued, transitioning directly into Gloria Estefan's "Rhythm Is Gonna Get You". Next, she sang the ballad "Break It to Me Gently" by Angela Bofill, before performing a medley of Sheena Easton's songs. After the performance, Velasquez sat centerstage and began a Sharon Cuneta tribute number. It was followed by a duet of Velasquez's songs with Jona Viray. 

The next segment started with a medley of the Spice Girls's hits.  The set list continued with a tribute number to Kuh Ledesma. She then performed a cover of Anita Baker's "Just Because". The next number saw Velasquez perform a medley of Mariah Carey's "Butterfly", "Never Too Far", and "My All", before proceeding with songs from the soundtrack of Whitney Houston's 1992 romantic film The Bodyguard. She closed the show with an encore performance of Christina Aguilera's Reflection. 

The concert was aired as a television special on GMA Network in 2006. That same year, Velasquez was awarded Female Entertainer of the Year at the 36th Box Office Entertainment Awards for the production.

Set list
This set list is adapted from the television special Reflections.

 "Fame"
 "Rhythm Is Gonna Get You"
 "Break It to Me Gently"
 "For Your Eyes Only" / "I Wouldn't Beg for Water" / "Almost Over You"
 "Mr. DJ" / "Dear Heart" / "P.S., I Love You"
 "Kailangan Ko'y Ikaw" / "You Are My Song" / "You've Made Me Stronger" / "Dadalhin"
 "2 Become 1" / "Holler" / "Say You'll Be There" / "Wannabe" / "Who Do You Think You Are"
 "Dito Ba?" / "Sana Bukas Pa Ang Kahapon" / "Wakas" / "Sana"
 "Just Because"
 "Butterfly" / "Never Too Far" / "My All"
 "I Will Always Love You" / "Run To You" / "I Have Nothing"
Encore
 "Reflection"

Shows

See also
 List of Regine Velasquez live performances

Notes

References

External links
 Tours of Regine Velasquez at Live Nation

Regine Velasquez concert tours
2005 concert residencies
2005 in the Philippines